Karakalpakstan, officially the Republic of Karakalpakstan, is an autonomous republic of Uzbekistan. It occupies the whole northwestern part of Uzbekistan. The capital is Nukus ( / ).

History 

From about 500 BC to 500 AD, the region of what is now Karakalpakstan was a thriving agricultural area supported by extensive irrigation. It was strategically important territory and fiercely contested, as is seen by the more than 50 Khorezm Fortresses which were constructed here. The Karakalpak people, who used to be nomadic herders and fishers, were first recorded by foreigners in the 16th century. Karakalpakstan was ceded to the Russian Empire by the Khanate of Khiva in 1873. Under Soviet rule, it was an autonomous area within the Russian Soviet Federative Socialist Republic before becoming part of Uzbekistan in 1936 as the Karakalpak ASSR. The region was probably at its most prosperous in the 1960s and 1970s, when irrigation from the Amu Darya was being expanded. However, the evaporation of the Aral Sea has made Karakalpakstan one of Uzbekistan's poorest regions. The region is suffering from extensive drought, partly due to climate patterns, but also largely because the Amu Darya and Syr Darya rivers are mostly diverted in the eastern parts of Uzbekistan. Crop failures have deprived about 48,000 people of their main source of income and shortages of potable water have created a surge of infectious diseases.

Geography 
Karakalpakstan is now mostly desert and is located in western Uzbekistan near the Aral Sea, in the lowest part of the Amu Darya basin. It has an area of 164,900 km2 and is surrounded by desert. The Kyzyl Kum Desert is located to the east and the Karakum Desert is located to the south. A rocky plateau extends west to the Caspian Sea.

Politics

Autonomous status 
The Republic of Karakalpakstan is formally sovereign and shares veto power over decisions concerning it with Uzbekistan. According to the constitution, relations between Karakalpakstan and Uzbekistan are "regulated by treaties and agreements" and any disputes are "settled by way of reconciliation". Its right to secede is limited by the veto power of Uzbekistan's legislature over any decision to secede. Article 74, chapter XVII, Constitution of Uzbekistan, provides that: "The Republic of Karakalpakstan shall have the right to secede from the Republic of Uzbekistan on the basis of a nationwide referendum held by the people of Karakalpakstan."

In July 2022, large protests broke out in the region over a proposed constitutional change which would strip Karakalpakstan of its autonomy. The proposed change was later scrapped in response to the demonstrations.

Leadership 
the government represented by the Council of Ministers of the Republic of Karakalpakstan and the republican parliament of the Joqarg'i Kenes of the Republic of Karakalpakstan .

The head of the republic is the Chairman of the Parliament (known as the "President of the Republic" from 1991 to 1992). The head of the government is the Chairman of the Council of Ministers, who heads the Karakalpak Council of Ministers.

One of the deputy chairmen of the Senate of the Oliy Majlis is a representative of Karakalpakstan as per the constitution.

Demographics 
The population is estimated 1,948,488 (2022), with 51% living in rural areas. In 2007 it was estimated that about 400,000 of the population are of the Karakalpak ethnic group, 400,000 are Uzbeks and 300,000 are Kazakhs. The Karakalpak language is closer to Kazakh than to Uzbek. The language was written in a modified Cyrillic in Soviet times and has been written in the Latin alphabet since 1996.

Other than the capital Nukus, major cities include Xojeli, Taqiyatas, Shimbay, Qońirat (Kungrad) and Moynaq.

The crude birth rate is 2.2%: approximately 39,400 children were born in 2017. Nearly 8,400 people died in the same period. The crude death rate is 0.47%. The natural growth rate is 31,000, or 1.72%.

The median age was 27.7 years old in 2017, which is younger than the rest of Uzbekistan (median age of 28.5 countrywide). Men are 27.1 years old, while women are 28.2 years old.

Dynamics of the number and ethnic composition of the population of Karakalpakstan according to the All-Union censuses of 1926–1989:

Economy 

The economy of the region used to be heavily dependent on fisheries in the Aral Sea. It is now supported by cotton, rice and melons. Karakalpakstan is well known for its fruits, such as plums, pears, grapes, and apricots, in addition to all kinds of melons. Hydroelectric power from a large Soviet-built station on the Amu Darya is also important.

The Amu Darya delta was once heavily populated and supported extensive irrigation based agriculture for thousands of years. Under the Khorezm, the area attained considerable power and prosperity. However, the gradual climate change over the centuries, accelerated by human induced evaporation of the Aral Sea in the late 20th century has created a desolate scene in the region. The ancient oases of rivers, lakes, reed marshes, forests and farms are drying up and being poisoned by wind-borne salt and by fertilizer and pesticide residues from the dried bed of the Aral Sea. The rate of anemia, respiratory diseases and other health problems has risen dramatically.

Administrative divisions 

The autonomous republic of Karakalpakstan consists of 16 districts (listed below) and one district-level city: Nukus (number 1 on map).
 

Taqiyatas district was created in 2017 from part of Xojeli district. Bozataw district was created in September 2019 from parts of the Kegeyli district and the Shimbay district.

There are 12 cities (Nókis, Mańg'it, Beruniy, Xaliqabat, Qońirat, Moynaq, Taqiyatas, Tórtkúl, Xojeli, Shimbay, Shomanay, Bostan) and 26 urban-type settlements in Karakalpakstan.

Media

Radio
In 2009, the first radio station of Karakalpakstan was opened. The station is called Nukus FM, which broadcasts on radio frequency 100.4 MHz, only in Nukus.

See also 
 Delta Blues (documentary film)
 Human rights in Uzbekistan
 Karakalpak Autonomous Oblast, a short-lived Soviet entity
 Karakalpak Autonomous Soviet Socialist Republic, an autonomous republic of the Russian Soviet Federative Socialist Republic and then the Uzbek SSR 
 Mizdahkan

Explanatory notes

References

External links 

 Official website of the Council of Ministers of the Republic of Karakalpakstan 
 Tours to Karakalpkstan
 Karakalpak music

 
Regions of Uzbekistan
Autonomous republics